Suren Phukan (born 17 November 1969) is a Bharatiya Janata Party politician from Assam. He has been elected in Assam Legislative Assembly election in 2016 from Digboi (Vidhan Sabha constituency).

References 

Living people
Bharatiya Janata Party politicians from Assam
Assam MLAs 2016–2021
People from Tinsukia district
Asom Gana Parishad politicians
Assam MLAs 2021–2026
1969 births